Santoczno  is a village in the administrative district of Gmina Kłodawa, within Gorzów County, Lubusz Voivodeship, in western Poland.

External links 
 Jewish Community in Santoczno on Virtual Shtetl

References

Santoczno